Federico Jesús Flores (born 18 May 1992) is an Argentine professional footballer who plays as a central midfielder for Gualaceo.

Career
Flores started in the youth teams of Rosario Central, he subsequently made his first-team debut on 16 June 2013 in a Primera B Nacional win over Deportivo Merlo as he was substituted on for the final five minutes. Rosario Central ended that season by winning promotion to the 2013–14 Argentine Primera División. Two years later, in June 2015, after making only one appearance for Rosario Central, Flores was loaned out to Bolivian Primera División side Real Potosí. His first match came on 9 August in a league defeat against Jorge Wilstermann. On 10 December, Flores scored a hat-trick in a 6–1 victory versus Oriente Petrolero.

Those were his only three goals in sixteen appearances in all competitions for the team. Upon returning to Rosario Central, he departed the club in 2016 to join fellow Argentine Primera División team Arsenal de Sarandí. His debut for Arsenal came in a Copa Argentina tie against Defensores de Belgrano on 12 August. After zero league appearances, he was released in July 2017. Following a spell with Sportivo Figherense, Flores signed for Ecuadorian Serie B side Gualaceo in February 2018.

Career statistics
.

Honours
Rosario Central
Primera B Nacional: 2012–13

References

External links

1992 births
Living people
Footballers from Rosario, Santa Fe
Argentine footballers
Association football midfielders
Argentine expatriate footballers
Expatriate footballers in Bolivia
Expatriate footballers in Ecuador
Argentine expatriate sportspeople in Bolivia
Argentine expatriate sportspeople in Ecuador
Primera Nacional players
Argentine Primera División players
Bolivian Primera División players
Ecuadorian Serie B players
Rosario Central footballers
Club Real Potosí players
Arsenal de Sarandí footballers